The Tomb of Princess Jeongseon is the burial area of the Andong Gwon clan.
It is located at the north side of Guro Girls' Information Industry High School in Gung-dong, Guro, Seoul.

Princess Jeongseon(1594-1614) was the seventh daughter of King Seonjo of Joseon (14th king of Joseon Dynasty).
She married Gwon Dae-im and lived in Gung-dong, Guro-gu, Seoul.
The region's name was changed 'Gong-dong' because they lived in a large house like a palace.

There are Andong Gwon clan's tombs and memorial hall. It is regarded as valuable research material.
Also, there is Gungdong Eco park nearby and it is good for taking a walk.
Tomb of Princess Jeongseon and Gung-dong Eco Park is one of the Nine Scenic Views of Guro (구로구경:九老九景).

References

External links
 The Tomb of Princess Jeongseon

Joseon dynasty
Archaeological sites in South Korea
Royal Tombs of the Joseon Dynasty
Guro District, Seoul